Tom Farndon (11 September 1910 – 30 August 1935), was a British speedway rider who won the Star Riders' Championship in 1933 whilst with the Crystal Palace Glaziers.

Career
Born in Coventry, Farndon started his career at the Lythalls Lane track in Foleshill and later rode for the club based at Brandon Stadium, before a spell with the Crystal Palace Glaziers. He moved to New Cross Lambs with Palace promoter Fred Mockford in 1934.

Farndon was the British Individual Match Race Champion and was undefeated from 1934 until his death in 1935.

Film appearance
The speedway scenes from the 1933 film Britannia of Billingsgate were shot at Hackney Wick Stadium and featured some of the leading riders in Britain at the time including Farndon, Colin Watson, Arthur Warwick, Gus Kuhn, Claude Rye and Ron Johnson.

Death
Tom Farndon was killed after a crash on 28 August 1935 whilst racing at the New Cross Stadium in a second half scratch race final. He was involved in a collision with team-mate Ron Johnson, who clipped the safety fence and fell causing Farndon to crash into Johnson's bike. Farndon suffered a fractured skull and spine injury and was unconscious when he was transferred to the Miller General Hospital in Greenwich. Tom died two days later (on 30 August) in Miller General Hospital, Greenwich, without regaining consciousness.

Thousands lined the streets to see his funeral. An art deco memorial in the form of a motorbike racer, carved by local sculptor Richard Ormerod out of black granite stands at Tom's final resting place in St. Paul's Cemetery, Holbrook Lane, Coventry.

Tom Farndon Memorial
Between 1935 and 1961, the Tom Farndon Memorial was held on 11 occasions at the New Cross Stadium. The running of the memorial was abandoned after 1961 on the closure of New Cross.

See also
Rider deaths in motorcycle racing

External links
 Vintage Speedway Magazine -Tom Farndon Story (Part One)
 Vintage Speedway Magazine -Tom Farndon Story (Part Two)
 Tom Farndon Headstone

References

1910 births
1935 deaths
British speedway riders
English motorcycle racers
Coventry Bees riders
New Cross Rangers riders
Motorcycle racers who died while racing
Sportspeople from Coventry
Sport deaths in England